Robert Melançon (born 12 May 1947) is a Canadian writer and translator. He has been a professor of literature at the Université de Montréal since 1972.

Melançon' was born in Montreal, Quebec.

Publications
1972 – The Poetic Image in France, Philippe Desportes Hopil Claude, 1570–1630

Honors
 1979 – Governor General's Award for French-language poetry or drama, Peinture aveugle 1990 – Governor General's Award for English to French translation, Second Rouleau (with Charlotte Melançon)
 2003 – Prix Victor-Barbeau, Exercices de désoeuvrement 2005 – Prix Alain-Grandbois, Le Paradis des apparences''

References

External links
 Robert Melancon entry in the Dictionary of Literary Biography

Living people
Prix Alain-Grandbois
20th-century Canadian poets
Canadian male poets
21st-century Canadian poets
Canadian poets in French
Writers from Montreal
1947 births
Governor General's Award-winning poets
Governor General's Award-winning translators
Academic staff of the Université de Montréal
20th-century Canadian translators
21st-century Canadian translators
20th-century Canadian male writers
21st-century Canadian male writers